Rosina Ferrario (1888–1959) was the first Italian woman to receive a pilot's licence when she passed her test on 3 January 1913 at Vizzola, Lombardy, in a Caproni monoplane. She received Licence No. 203 from the Aeroclub of Italy.

Biography
Born into an affluent bourgeois family, Ferrario worked as a clerk. She was an avid sportswoman and mountain climber, as well as a keen cyclist. After receiving her pilot's licence, she took part in several demonstrations and exhibition flights in 1913 and 1914, for example in Naples, Rome and Como. In October 1913, in connection with celebrations for the 100th anniversary of Giuseppe Verdi's birth in Busseto, she flew alongside Achille Landini. In June 1913, she spent a day in a hot air balloon with Erminio Donner Flori, flying from Milan to Lodi.

In 1914, Ferrario was unable to accept an invitation to fly in South America as the First World War had been declared. She applied to work for the Red Cross in Italy but was refused as she was not in the military. There is little information on Ferrario until 1921 when she was living happily married to Enrico Grugnola whom she met on an outing with the Italian Alpine Club. Together they opened a hotel with a large garden in Milan where they lived with their two children. She regularly attended meetings of the Pionieri dell'Aeronautica (Aviation Pioneers) but no longer flew. She continued to be recognized as a pioneer until her death in 1959.

References

1888 births
1959 deaths
People from Milan
Women aviators
Italian aviators
Aviation pioneers
Italian women aviators